Festuca occidentalis is a species of grass known as western fescue. It is native to much of the northern half of North America and is most widely distributed in the west. It is most often found in forest and woodland habitat. The specific epithet occidentalis is Latin, meaning "western".

Description
Festuca occidentalis is a tufted fescue that lacks rhizomes. Culms have two exposed nodes and have glabrous internodes. The shoots are intravaginal.

The leaf sheaths are glabrescent and rounded with a prominent midvein. The position of the auricle is marked by a distinct swelling. The basal offshoots are erect, arising from the tops of the pale brown sheaths.

The unequal glumes are narrow and acute. Lodicules are toothed and lack trichomes. The ovary is pubescent at its apex.

It flowers from late June into July.

Distribution and habitat 
Festuca occidentalis occurs in the northern United States from the Bruce Peninsula to northern Michigan and eastern Wisconsin, and from Montreal and British Columbia south to Wyoming and California.

It grows in dry to moist woods, thickets, and rocky slopes.

References

External links
Festuca occidentalis — U.C. Photo gallery

occidentalis
Grasses of Canada
Grasses of the United States